is a Japanese novel written by Tomihiko Morimi, originally published by Gentosha in 2007, with a sequel published in 2015. An anime television series adaptation based on the first book aired from July to September 2013 and was simulcast by Crunchyroll. A second season based on the second book aired from April to June 2017.

Plot
In modern-day Kyoto, humans live in the city while tanuki roam the earth and tengu roam the sky. The story surrounds a family of tanuki, the Shimogamo family. They have the ability to transform into anything they wish, from humans to any animate/inanimate object. The third son, Yasaburō, enjoys a bustling daily life. He often visits his teacher Professor Akadama, a tengu. Through Akadama, Yasaburō is acquainted with Benten, a human woman whom Akadama taught to fly like a tengu. As the story unfolds, the members of the Shimogamo family are still dealing with the foggy past that surrounds their father's untimely death prior to the series's start. To complicate matters, Benten is a member of a social group called the Friday Fellows, people who enjoy a meal of tanuki hot pot at the end of the year. The Shimogamo family must balance between living carelessly, maintaining relationships among other tanuki families, and not getting put into a hot pot by the Friday Fellows.

Characters

Shimogamo family

The main character and the third Shimogamo son. He is the most carefree among his siblings with a talent for getting himself in trouble. 

The first Shimogamo son. He aims to be , the leader of the tanuki society, like his father once was.

The second Shimogamo son. He transformed himself into a frog for so long that he forgot how to turn back. He now lives in a pond inside a well where he provides advice to others. 

The fourth Shimogamo son. He is shy and his tail or ears often pop out when he is frightened. He works at the Electric Wine Factory with Kinkaku and Ginkaku.

 
The matriarch of the Shimogamo family. She is very protective of her children and does her best to make up for the loss of their father, to the point of usually dressing as a male when not working. Whenever there is a lightning storm, she loses her ability to transform, due to severe astrapophobia.

The late father of the Shimogamo brothers and the former leader of all of tanuki in Kyoto called Nise-emon. He was eaten by the Friday Fellows years before the story's beginning after falling into a trap set by Benten.

Ebisugawa family

Sōichirō's younger brother and uncle of the Shimogamo brothers. He severed relations with the Shimogamo family following Sōichirō's death and aims to replace him as the Nise-emon. Later it is revealed that Sōun was always envious of his brother, as he fell in love with Yasaburō's mother before she married Sōichirō and lost the election for Nise-emon to him. These events led to him betraying Sōichirō by helping Benten capture Sōichirō, leading to Sōichirō's death.
 and 
 (Kinkaku), Kosuke Hatakeyama (Ginkaku)
Sōun's twin sons and cousins of the Shimogamo brothers. They like to bully Yashirō and look down on the Shimogamo family.

Sōun's daughter and Yasaburō's cousin. Kaisei and Yasaburo's fathers had originally planned for them to marry, but the marriage agreement was called off by Sōun after Sōichirō's death. Later it is revealed that Yajirō also had feelings for her. Kaisei hates Benten for being involved in Soun's plan to dispose of her uncle. She also refrains from appearing to Yasaburō in her true form, because it somehow undoes his transformation, a fact she hides from him until her father's death.

Sōun's eldest son and the older brother of Kinkaku and Ginkaku. After his father's death, he approaches the Shimogamos and make peace with them.

Other characters

A young, beautiful, and capricious human woman apparently allied with a dangerous group of humans, the Friday Fellows. She was kidnapped as a child and kept as a ward by Professor Akadama and occupies a unique role in the story as a link between the three worlds of human, tanuki and tengu. Akadama raised her as tengu and taught her tengu magic, giving her powerful magical artifacts that she uses for her own motives. After reaching adulthood, she seemingly spurns Akadama and returns to the human world. Her behavior is driven solely by her own mysterious motivations, and she is used as a pawn as much as she manipulates others. She maintains a relationship with the rebellious younger Yasaburō, who both respects and fears her. Despite seeming to be heartless, she has a lonely and sad side that only a few are privy to, such as Yasaburō and his brother Yajirō.

An old tengu and the teacher of the Shimogamo brothers. The brothers check up on him from time to time and take care of him, cleaning up his messy apartment and bringing him supplies and liquor. He injured his back in an accident, rendering walking difficult and flying impossible. He spends his days in seclusion and rarely leaves his apartment. He kidnapped Benten when she was younger and raised her, teaching her tengu magic and giving her his most valued treasures. After she grew to womanhood, she chose to leave Akadama's side to follow her own goals. Despite that, Akadama still cares for her and always feels himself lonely when she is not around.

Professor Akadama's estranged son who returns to Kyoto in the second season. He dresses and behaves as an English gentleman and has a sort of feud with Benten.

A mysterious man with the power of casting illusions who somehow escaped from hell.

Yaichirō's childhood friend and longtime crush. During the course of the second season, they officially become a couple.

Gyokuran's older brother, who approves her relationship with Yaichirō.

Media

Print
The Eccentric Family is written by Tomihiko Morimi, and the first novel was published by Gentosha on September 25, 2007. A sequel titled  was released on February 26, 2015. A third novel is planned.

A manga adaptation of the first novel, illustrated by Yu Okada, with character designs by  Kōji Kumeta, was serialized in Gentosha's Comic Birz magazine from the June 2013 to May 2015 issues. Gentosha published four tankōbon volumes from September 24, 2013, to June 24, 2015.

Anime
The first 13-episode season aired in Japan from July 7 to September 23, 2013, on Tokyo MX, KBS, SUN, BS11, Kids Station, and KNB. The director is Masayuki Yoshihara, the scriptwriter is Shōtarō Suga, the music is scored by Yoshiaki Fujisawa, and the animation is done by P.A. Works. Kōji Kumeta provided character designs. The opening theme is titled  by Milktub. The ending theme is titled  by Fhána. The anime was released in Japan across seven volumes from August 25, 2013, to March 26, 2017. Crunchyroll streamed the series and NIS America released the series in North America as a premium set including two Blu-ray disc sets on January 5, 2015.

A second season, was greenlit on September 28, 2016. The second season was aired in Japan from April 9 to June 25, 2017, on Tokyo MX, KBS, and KNB and was streamed on Docomo Anime Store in Japan, and Crunchyroll. The main staff and cast members returned for the second season.

Episode list

Season 1

Season 2

References

External links
Official anime website 

2013 anime television series debuts
2017 anime television series debuts
2007 Japanese novels
Anime and manga based on novels
Comedy-drama anime and manga
Fiction about shapeshifting
Gentosha manga
Japanese mythology in anime and manga
Kyoto in fiction
P.A.Works
Seinen manga
Television shows based on Japanese novels
Television shows set in Japan
Tokyo MX original programming
Yōkai in anime and manga